Confessions of Fire is the debut studio album by the Harlem rapper Cam'ron, released in 1998. Its singles were "Horse & Carriage," featuring Mase, "357" and "Feels Good" featuring Usher. Originally titled "Who Is Cam'ron?"—the album was certified gold by the RIAA with over 500,000 copies sold. The album debuted and peaked at no. 6 on The Billboard 200, selling over 107,000 copies in its first week of release.

Track listing

Leftover tracks
"Pull It" (featuring DMX)

Sample credits
"357" contains a sample of  "Magnum P.I. Theme" by Mike Post.
"A Pimp's A Pimp" contains a sample of "Don't Turn the Lights Off" by The Originals.
"D Rugs" contains a sample of "Mother's Theme (Mama)" by Willie Hutch and "I'm Your Pusherman" by Curtis Mayfield.
"Feels Good" contains a sample of "When Somebody Loves You Back" by Teddy Pendergrass.
"Fuck You" contains a sample of "Phuck U Symphony" by Millie Jackson.
"Me & My Boo" contains a sample of "Being With You" by Smokey Robinson. 
"Prophecy" contains a sample of "Fragile" by Sting.
"Me, My Moms & Jimmy" contains samples of "Genius Of Love" by Tom Tom Club and "Mama Used to Say" by Junior.
"Wrong Ones" contains a sample of "As We Lay" by Shirley Murdock.
"Horse & Carriage" contains samples of "Cuban Cabby" by Desi Arnaz and "Who Is He (And What Is He to You)?" by Bill Withers.
"Death" contains a sample of "Suicidal Thoughts" by The Notorious B.I.G.
"We Got it" contains a sample of "Say What" by Idris Muhammad

Charts and certifications

Certifications

References

1998 albums
Cam'ron albums
Albums produced by Jermaine Dupri
Albums produced by Swizz Beatz
Albums produced by Trackmasters